Dehydroalanine (Cα,β-didehydroalanine, α,β-di-dehydroalanine, 2-aminoacrylate, or 2,3-didehydroalanine) is a dehydroamino acid. It does not exist in its free form, but it occurs naturally as a residue found in peptides of microbial origin. As an amino acid residue, it is unusual because it has an unsaturated backbone.

Structure and reactivity
Like most primary enamines, dehydroalanine is unstable.  Dehydroalanine hydrolyzes to pyruvate.

N-Acylated derivatives of dehydroalanine, such as peptides and related compounds, are stable.  For example, methyl 2-acetamidoacrylate is the N-acetylated derivative of the ester.  As a residue in a peptide, it is generated by a post translational modification.  The required precursors are serine or cysteine residues, which undergo enzyme-mediated loss of water and hydrogen sulfide, respectively.

Most amino acid residues are unreactive toward nucleophiles, but those containing dehydroalanine or some other dehydroamino acids are exceptions. These are electrophilic due to the α,β-unsaturated carbonyl, and can, for example, alkylate other amino acids. This activity has made DHA useful synthetically to prepare lanthionine.

Occurrence
The dehydroalanine residue was first detected in nisin, a cyclic peptide with antimicrobial activity. Dehydroalanine is also present in some lantibiotics and microcystins.

DHA can be formed from cysteine or serine by simple base catalysis without the need for an enzyme, which can happen during cooking and alkaline food preparation processes. It can then alkylate other amino acid residues, such as lysine, forming lysinoalanine cross-links and racemization of the original alanine. The resulting proteins have lower nutritional quality for some species but higher nutritional quality for others. Some lysinoalanines may also cause kidney enlargement in rats.

Many dehydroalanine-containing peptides are toxic.

A dehydroalanine residue was long thought to be an important electrophilic catalytic residue in histidine ammonia-lyase and phenylalanine ammonia-lyase enzymes, but the active residue was later found instead to be a different unsaturated alanine derivative — 3,5-dihydro-5-methyldiene-4H-imidazol-4-one — that is even more electrophilic.

References

Amino acids
Non-proteinogenic amino acids